Lanny Flaherty (born July 27, 1942) is an American actor.

Career 
He has given his most memorable performances in Lonesome Dove, Natural Born Killers, Book of Shadows: Blair Witch 2 and Signs. Flaherty attended University of Southern Mississippi after high school. He also had a brief role in Men in Black 3, and appeared as Jack Crow in Jim Mickles 2014 adaptation of Cold in July. Other film appearances include Winter People, Millers Crossing, Blood In Blood Out, Tom and Huck and Home Fries while television roles include guest appearances on The Equalizer, New York News and White Collar as well as a 2 episode stint on The Education of Max Bickford as Whammo.

Personal life 
Flaherty resides in New York City.

Filmography

Film

Television

References

External links

Living people
American male film actors
1942 births